This is a list of famous Iranians of Armenian descent.

 Key
People who were born outside of Iran but worked or lived in Iran highlighted in boldface

Art

Literature

Politics

Religion

Dancer

Sciences

Sports

Others

Armenian Parents 

People who were born from Armenian Parents

See also
Iranian Armenians
List of Iranians

References

 
 
 

 
Armenian
Lists of Armenian people
Armenian